Torque is a supervillain in the DC Comics Universe and an enemy of Nightwing. Created by writer Chuck Dixon and artist Scott McDaniel, he first appeared in Nightwing (vol. 2) #1 (October 1996).

Fictional character biography
Inspector Dudley "Deadly" Soames was the dirtiest man working in the corrupt Blüdhaven Police Department. He first met Nightwing when he was ordered by Delmore Redhorn, the Police Chief, to execute the young vigilante. Soames, however, betrayed Redhorn and allowed Nightwing to live, with the intention to pit various factions in Blüdhaven against one another. He played both sides of the legal fence: he fed information on the Blockbuster's criminal dealings to Nightwing, served the Blockbuster as a mob lieutenant and oversaw many of the criminal activities of Chief Redhorn's corrupt tenure with the police.

After Soames' scheme to use the Scarecrow against Nightwing failed disastrously, the Blockbuster grew weary of his underling and attempted to have him killed. Soames responded with surprising cunning and ultimately tried to take the Blockbuster's invalid mother hostage as part of a last bid for power. Nightwing attempted to intervene, but was forced to save innocent bystanders as the Blockbuster twisted the dirty cop's head 180 degrees, leaving Soames for dead.

However, Soames survived by sheer luck, as his windpipe remained undamaged long enough for him to be moved to life support. Although his neck was permanently twisted, thanks to a breakthrough medical technique, sophisticated micro-surgery was able to reattach his nerve endings so that he could move again. With control of his body restored, but informed that it would be impossible to turn his head back the right way around, Soames spent some time retraining himself to move normally, "seeing through the back of his head" with the use of glasses with a built-in array of mirrors. Still disgusted at his new condition despite the doctor's assurances that everything that could be done had been done, Soames brutally killed the doctor that had saved his life, morbidly renamed himself Torque, and (gaining the support of Intergang) started a new gang war for the control of Blüdhaven, revenge against the Blockbuster, Nightwing and the city he now felt he owned.

Torque fights Nightwing and the vigilante "Nite-Wing" shortly after the assassination of Ricky Noone. The Blockbuster is not pleased that there is a crime turf war without him.

After descending further into madness, Soames was brought to justice by Nightwing, only to arrange a prison break with the help of the imprisoned vigilante Nite-Wing. This would prove his undoing, since once freed, he wasted no time in returning to his old plans, even attempting to enlist Nite-Wing into his reign of terror. The vigilante, however, had a zero-tolerance policy for crime and, upon realizing Soames' true nature, the two entered into a Mexican standoff that only Nite-Wing survived.

In other media
Torque briefly appears in the Arrow season two finale "Unthinkable", portrayed by Michael Adamthwaite. After Amanda Waller orders a drone strike on Star City, John Diggle and Lyla Michaels release all of the Suicide Squad, including Torque, who then force Waller to stop the drone strike, which she eventually complies to. Though his real name is never stated, it is most likely the same one as his comic book counterpart.

See also
List of Batman family enemies

References

Characters created by Chuck Dixon
Comics characters introduced in 1996
Fictional gangsters
Fictional murderers
DC Comics police officers
DC Comics supervillains
Dick Grayson